John Coventry (1735–1812) was an English constructor of scientific instruments. He made a reputation through the accuracy of his instruments.

Life
Coventry was born in Southwark. He worked with Benjamin Franklin and William Henly on electrical experiments, in the capacity of assistant.

Works
He was the inventor of a new hygrometer, more accurate than any which had been previously in use. This instrument was generally employed by the chemists and other scientific men of his day. His telescopes were found to be more accurately adjusted than those usually employed, and the lenses with which they were fitted were more truly ground. His graduations were especially correct.

References

Attribution

1735 births
1812 deaths
People from Southwark
British scientific instrument makers